Panchlaish is a thana of Chattogram District in Chattogram Division, Bangladesh.

Geography
It has 37105 households and total area 27.45 km².

Demographics
At the 1991 Bangladesh census, Panchlaish had a population of 193,357, of whom 112,099 were aged 18 or older. Males constituted 59.39% of the population, and females 40.61%. Panchlaish had an average literacy rate of 59.3% (7+ years), against the national average of 32.4%.

See also
 Upazilas of Bangladesh
 Districts of Bangladesh
 Divisions of Bangladesh

Notable residents
 Shakil Khan, film actor
 Capt. Dr Syed Nasiruddin Ahmed,

References

Thanas of Chittagong District